BearingPoint (parent company: BearingPoint Europe Holdings B.V.) is an independent multinational management and technology consulting firm with 41 offices across 23 countries and around 4,300 employees. In 2021, the firm delivered 1,298 projects in 50 countries.

Services 
BearingPoint operates in three business units: Consulting, Products, and Capital.

Consulting 
The consulting unit covers the advisory business with a clear focus on selected business areas. It is divided into eight market segments:

 Automotive, Industrial Equipment & Manufacturing
 Banking & Capital Markets
 Chemicals, Life Sciences & Resources
 Consumer Goods & Retail
 Insurance
 Communications, Media & Entertainment
 Government & Public Sector
 Utilities, Postal & Transportation

The consulting unit has a service portfolio consisting of five lines:

 People & Strategy
 Customer & Growth
 Finance & Risk
 Operations
 Technology

Products 
The products unit provides managed services for business-critical processes such as software services and IP-driven digital assets including an Emissions Calculator and a Data Quality Navigator.

Capital 
The capital unit is responsible for supporting transactions and growth opportunities within BearingPoint and for their clients. This includes M&A strategy, due diligence, managing investments and inorganic growth agendas.

Regions and Offices 
BearingPoint do not have a defined headquarters, instead operating across 41 offices in 23 countries.

Europe 

 Austria – Graz, 2 offices in Vienna
 Belgium - Brussels
 Czech Republic - Prague
 Denmark - Frederiksberg
 Finland - Helsinki
 France - Paris
 Germany - Berlin, Düsseldorf, Frankfurt, Hamburg, Leipzig, Munich, Stuttgart, Walldorf
 Ireland - Dublin
 Italy - Milan, Turin
 Luxembourg
 Netherlands - Amsterdam
 Norway - Oslo
 Portugal - Lisbon
 Romania - Bucharest, Iași, Sibiu, 2 offices in Timișoara
 Sweden - Stockholm, Malmö
 Switzerland - Geneva, Zurich,
 United Kingdom - London

Asia and Middle East 

 China - Shanghai
 India - Bengaluru
 Singapore
 UAE - Abu Dhabi, Dubai

Africa 

 Morocco - Casablanca

North America 

 USA – Chicago, Dallas

BearingPoint also have locations in collaboration with other consultancy firms. They work with grupo ASSA across Central and South America, West Monroe Partners in North America and Abeam Consulting in parts of Asia including Thailand, Japan and Korea.

Awards and Recognitions 
BearingPoint has received a number of awards since the BearingPoint brand was transitioned to an independent European partnership in 2009.

 In 2022 BearingPoint were listed among the World’s Best Management Consulting Firms by Forbes 
 2022 WealthBriefing Swiss Awards for Management Consultancy
 2022 Recognized as a Top Consulting Firm by Handelsblatt
 2022 SAP® Pinnacle Award in the Sustainability Category
 Winner of the 2021 IFS Growth Partner of the Year award
 Recognized as a Major Player in the IDC MarketScape: Worldwide Smart Manufacturing Service Providers 2021 Vendor Assessment
 Visionary in the 2021 Gartner Magic Quadrant™ for CRM and Customer Experience Implementation Services
 2021 SAP® Pinnacle Award in the Partner Application of the Year – Industry Cloud Category
 2021 WirtschaftsWoche Best of Consulting Award 
 2019 FinTech & RegTech Global Award Distributed Ledger Technology Provider of the Year
 2018 Three Catalyst project awards at Digital Transformation World - BearingPoint // Beyond with Infonova – won the TM Forum Digital Excellence OPEN API Award.

Acquisitions & Joint Ventures 
BearingPoint have made a number of targeted acquisitions since 2009.

 I Care, a France and Brazil-based consultancy firm specializing in sustainability strategy development and environmental transition. (2022)
 Disphere tech, a Germany-based provider of sales support for financial services businesses. This acquisition included disphere’s cloud platform diContract, which automates and digitises processes such as customer onboarding (2022)
 Steerio, a Paris-based engagement platform (SaaS) that leverages smart analytics (2020)
 YouMeO, a Paris-based strategy and innovation agency (2020)
 Prederi, a consultancy focused on public services in the UK (2019)
 Inpuls, a data specialist in Belgium (2018)
 LCP Consulting, a UK-based international specialist consultancy in customer-driven supply chain management (2017)
 Magenta, a digital management consultancy in the Nordics (2015)
 Trinity Horne, a UK-based operational performance consultancy (2013)
 RiValue, a German-based risk management and reporting specialist (2013)
 HyperCube, a business analytics software, in which BearingPoint acquired a major stake (2011)

Arcwide 
Arcwide is a joint venture with IFS, established in April 2022 which focuses on business transformation.

Management 
The BearingPoint management team comprises leaders from all over Europe and across industries and services:

 Kiumars Hamidian - Managing Partner – Kiumars joined BearingPoint in 1996 and became a partner in 2002, He was one of the founding partners in the European management buyout in 2009 and was elected Managing Partner in 2018.
 Eric Conway - Regional Leader Finland, Ireland, Netherlands, Norway, Italy, Sweden and UK – Eric has been a Partner at BearingPoint since 2014.
 Andreas Flach - Chief Financial Officer – Andreas joined BearingPoint as a partner in 2016 after having previously worked as a financial auditor of BearingPoint.
 Iris Grewe- Regional Leader Germany, Switzerland, Austria – Iris became a Partner at BearingPoint in 2010.
 Matthias Loebich - Global Leader Markets and Networks – Matthias has been a Partner at BearingPoint since 2007.
 Axelle Paquer - Regional Leader France, Belgium, Luxembourg and Africa – Axelle has been a partner at BearingPoint since 2011.
 Damien Palacci- Global Leader Consulting Portfolio – Damien has been a partner at BearingPoint since 2008.
 Patrick Palmgren- Global Leader BearingPoint Capital (Software Solutions, M&A and Ventures) – Patrick has been a partner at BearingPoint since 2005.
 Hughes Verdier - Chief Operating Officer – Hughes has been a partner at the firm since 1996.
 Donald Wachs - Global Leader Business Services – Donald has been a Partner at BearingPoint since 2004.
 Stephan Weber - Chief People Officer – Stephan has been at the firm since 1997, he became a partner in 2009.

History

1997 to August 2009
BearingPoint's origins lie in the consulting services operations of KPMG, which were established as a distinct business unit in 1997. KPMG had been providing consulting services to clients since its first contract with the US Navy prior to World War I. On 31 January 2000, KPMG formally spun off the consulting unit as KPMG Consulting, LLC. On 8 February 2001, the company went public on the NASDAQ market at $18 a share under the ticker "KCIN."

Over the next year and a half, the company acquired some of KPMG's country consulting practices, plus country practices and hiring from Arthur Andersen’s business consulting unit. On 2 October 2002, the company was re-named BearingPoint and the next day began trading on the New York Stock Exchange under the ticker "BE."

After the 2003 invasion of Iraq, the company acquired a $9 million contract to outline and implement new economic regulations and institutions for the country, heavily focusing on neoliberal policies such as large-scale privatizations. According to a report by Stephen Foley, "BearingPoint employees gave $117,000 (£60,000) to the 2000 and 2004 Bush election campaigns, more than any other Iraq contractor."

BearingPoint was late in filing its financial reports through 2007. The Company said its net loss for the first quarter ended 31 March 2007 narrowed as revenue grew and costs declined. The company recorded a net loss of $61.7 million, or 29 cents per share for the first quarter, compared with a loss of $72.7 million, or 34 cents per share, in the same period a year earlier. The company recorded a net loss of $64.0 million, or 30 cents per share for the second quarter, compared with a loss of $2.85 million, or 1 cent per share, in the same period a year earlier. BearingPoint's shareholders' deficit was $365 million as of the close of the second quarter 2007 with a total accumulated deficit of $1.9 billion. On 11 August 2008, the company reported its first net income in three years and, as of the third quarter of 2008, had reported operating income for three consecutive quarters. During the third quarter of 2008, BearingPoint said its net loss was $30.5 million or $0.14 a share, an improvement of $37.5 million compared to the third quarter of 2007. BearingPoint's shareholders' deficit was $469.2 million as of the close of the third quarter 2008.

In 2007, BearingPoint had differences with their major client Hawaiian Telcom. due to issues with an IT system contract. On 7 February 2007, BearingPoint and Hawaiian Telcom reached a settlement of $52 million to end the partnership and erase an additional $30 million in previously submitted invoices.

On 10 December 2008, BearingPoint filed a Certificate of Amendment to the Certificate of Incorporation of the company with the Secretary of State of the State of Delaware to effect a previously approved reverse stock split of the company's outstanding common stock, par value $0.01 per share, at a ratio of one-for-fifty. The reverse stock split became effective at 6:01 p.m., Eastern Time, on 10 December 2008, at which time every fifty shares of Common Stock that were issued and outstanding automatically combined into one issued and outstanding share of Common Stock. On 13 November 2008, BearingPoint received notice from NYSE Regulation, Inc. (NYSE) that the NYSE had decided to suspend BearingPoint's common stock from trading prior to the market opening on 17 November 2008.

The company filed for Chapter 11 in the U.S. Bankruptcy Court in the Southern District of New York on 18 February 2009, with $2.23 billion in total debt and $1.76 billion in total assets as of 30 September. The filing included only the company's U.S. operations. Unable to sustain the heavy debt load resulting from ill-advised expansion moves, costly management errors and audit fees associated with the bankruptcy process, the company negotiated debt for equity swaps with its creditors and zeroed the value of its common shares, wiping out existing investors.

By May 2009, the company's Japan business unit and North American Commercial Services practice had been sold to PwC and its North American Public Services practice had been sold to Deloitte. Its Brazil unit was sold to CSC in July 2009 and its China unit was sold to Perot Systems in October of the same year.

August 2009 to present
On 28 August 2009, control of BearingPoint was transferred to its European management team, with continuing operations owned by about 150 partners in 13 countries throughout Europe. Peter Mockler, who had been serving as the EMEA leader for BearingPoint since 2006, and his management team continued to lead the organisation, providing leadership stability and continuity. Employing 3,709 people in the European region, the independent company kept the BearingPoint brand.

In Australia, BearingPoint completed a local management buy-out in September 2009. The China-based information technology company HiSoft acquired BearingPoint Australia for an undisclosed sum in July 2012.

The European BearingPoint partnership has grown its revenues since becoming independent, from €441 million in 2009 to €738 million (2021). It now has offices in 17 European countries, outside Europe the firm has offices in Asia, the Middle East, US and Africa.

Since 2009, BearingPoint has made acquisitions (see acquisitions section) across the globe and formed strategic alliances with West Monroe Partners in North America, Grupo ASSA in South America, and ABeam in Asia. The expansion of the business has led to new subsidiaries in China, the US, Italy, the UAE, Portugal, Singapore, the Czech Republic, Luxembourg, and India.

In November 2020, BearingPoint sold their regulatory technology business unit, BearingPoint RegTech to Nordic Capital for an undisclosed fee, which since has become Regnology.

In November 2021, BearingPoint announced the spinning-off of its independent digital platform business unit, BearingPoint Beyond, which has since become Beyond Now 

In February 2022, BearingPoint began a collaboration with SAP for carbon neutrality. In April 2022, BearingPoint entered a joint venture with IFS called Arcwide focusing on business transformation (see Acquisitions & Joint Ventures section).

References

External links 

Official site
YouTube

International management consulting firms
International information technology consulting firms
Companies based in Amsterdam
Consulting firms established in 2000
Companies that filed for Chapter 11 bankruptcy in 2009